Edward Hunter may refer to:

Edward Hunter (Billy Banjo) (1885–1959), also known as Billy Banjo, Scottish-born socialist
Edward Hunter (Mormon) (1793–1883), third Presiding Bishop of The Church of Jesus Christ of Latter-day Saints 
Edward Hunter (United States Army) (1839–1928), American army officer
Edward Hunter (journalist) (1902–1978), American journalist and intelligence agent
Dr. Edward Hunter, namesake of the Hunter's bend knot
Edward M. Hunter (1826–1878), American politician and lawyer

Other
Eddie Hunter (EastEnders), EastEnders character
Ed Hunter, a 1999 first-person shooter video game
Ed Hunter (director), a pornographic film director and producer

See also
Sir Edward Hunter-Blair, 8th Baronet (1920–2006), British nobleman
Ted Hunter, a fictional character in Air Hostess (1933 film)